Fleury is a commune in the Moselle department in Grand Est in north-eastern France.

Geography
The village is sited on a wooded plateau, high above the river Seille. The hilly topography gives rise to a range of microclimates and so agriculture surrounding the village is mixed, featuring arable crops and cattle rearing as well as vineyards.

History
Fleury was located within Saulnois, a region known as a source of salt over many centuries and under the control of the Three Bishoprics province.

Fleury was destroyed in 1352 by the army of the regent of Lorraine.

See also
 Communes of the Moselle department

References

External links
 

Communes of Moselle (department)